Ľudmila Maťavková (born 11 April 1998) is a Slovak footballer who plays as midfielder for Club YLA in the Belgian Women's Super League.
She played before in the Czech First Division for the 1. FC Slovácko and in the Slovak Women's First League for the Slovan Bratislava. 
She plays for the Slovakia women's national team.

Career
After being detected at the age of 14 by the German club Eintracht Frankfurt, Matavkova chose the Czech Republic and the club of 1. FC Slovácko as her first experience abroad. During 3 years she played and continued her studies. She returned for a year in the best Slovakian team Slovan Bratislava and won the Slovak leagues in 2019.

Matavkova played the 2019–20 UEFA Women's Champions League qualifying round against Ferencváros, ŽFK Spartak Subotica and Anenii Noi. 

Maťavková has been capped for the Slovakia national team, appearing for the team during the 2019 FIFA Women's World Cup qualifying cycle.

in July 2020, Maťavková signed with Charleroi and became the first slovak female player in the Belgian League. She made her debut on 16 July 2020 and scored the first goal in the history of the club's women's team during the game.

Honours

 Slovak leagues Winner : 2019
 Czech First Division Third Place : 2017, 2018
Czech Women's Cup finalist : 2018

Talent of the year 2013 Slovak leagues.

References

External links
 
 Profile at soccerdonna.de 
 
 
 

1998 births
Living people
Slovak women's footballers
Slovakia women's international footballers
Women's association football midfielders
ŠK Slovan Bratislava (women) players
1. FC Slovácko (women) players
Expatriate women's footballers in the Czech Republic
Slovak expatriate sportspeople in the Czech Republic
People from Partizánske District
Sportspeople from the Trenčín Region
Expatriate women's footballers in Belgium
Slovak expatriate sportspeople in Belgium
Czech Women's First League players
Club Brugge KV (women) players